Martin William Francis Stone (born 1965) is an Irish philosopher who served as a professor of philosophy at the Katholieke Universiteit Leuven. In 2010 he was found guilty of plagiarizing texts in more than 40 publications and subsequently dismissed from his university post.

Biography 
Martin Stone was a professor at the Katholieke Universiteit Leuven's Institute of Philosophy. He also served for a time on the faculty of King's College in London. While employed by these universities, his research centred on the philosophy of the Late Middle Ages and the Renaissance.

Stone's credentials made him appear highly qualified. He had received his bachelor's degree in classics and philosophy from King's College, University of London, and a master's in philosophy from the University of Paris. Further study took him to the University of Cambridge, yet for the degrees of M.Phil and the philosophical doctorate, he returned to London University's Birkbeck College. He has held post-doctoral fellowships at the prestigious Warburg Institute in London, as well as shorter appointments at the London School of Economics, Oxford University, and was hired to teach courses on the philosophy of religion at his alma mater, King's College London.

In 2010, first reports of plagiarism were made public by several scholars. Among them, Ilkka Kantola, a Member of Parliament in Finland, said that Stone had copied extensively from Kantola’s 1994 book Probability and Moral Uncertainty in Late Medieval and Early Modern Times: "tens of pages were identical or nearly identical, although my name was not mentioned at all", Kantola said in a 2010 interview. The investigators Dougherty, Harsting, and Friedman have documented 40 instances of plagiarism in an academic journal. 

In January 2010, the Commission on Scientific Integrity at Katholieke Universiteit Leuven sent notifications to editors who had published Stone’s works, stating that "the conduct of Martin Stone is highly questionable in terms of scientific integrity" and that the university "formally retracts its affiliation" with the publications by Stone which appeared when he was a professor there.

See also 
 List of scientific misconduct incidents

References

Living people
21st-century Irish philosophers
People involved in plagiarism controversies
People involved in scientific misconduct incidents
Alumni of the University of Cambridge
Academic staff of KU Leuven
1965 births